The Lelyakivsky oil field is a Ukrainian oil field that was discovered in 1963. It began production in 1965 and produces oil.

References

Oil fields in Ukraine
Oil fields of the Soviet Union